Synthetic Generation is the debut album of the Swedish metal band Deathstars. This was the only album to have Beast X Electric (Erik Halvorsen) on rhythm guitar.

Track listing

Band personnel 
 Whiplasher Bernadotte – vocals
 Nightmare Industries – lead guitar, keyboards, electronics, bass
 Beast X Electric – rhythm guitar
 Bone W. Machine – drums

Guest musician
 Johanna Beckström – female vocals

Production personnel 
Håkan Åkesson – mastering
Thomas Ewerhard – design
Anders Fridén – engineer
Stefan Glaumann – mixing

2003 debut albums
Deathstars albums